Retaliator or variants may refer to:

F29 Retaliator, combat flight simulator video game  1989
The Retaliators (novel), novel in Matt Helm series
The Retaliators (film), upcoming American thriller film